Gerty Archimède (Gerty, Marie, Bernadette Archimède) (born 26 April 1909 in Morne-a-l'Eau, Guadeloupe – died 15 April 1980 in Morne-a-l'Eau, Guadeloupe) was a politician from Guadeloupe who served in the French National Assembly from 1946-1951. She was the first female lawyer to pass the Guadeloupe Bar and the second black woman elected to the French National Assembly, shortly after Eugénie Éboué-Tell.

Archimède was a lawyer, prominent member of the Parti Communiste Guadeloupeen (PCG), founder and president of the Union des Femmes Guadeloupeennes, conseiller general from Basse-Terre, Guadeloupe.

Biography 
The oldest of a five children family, Gerty is the daughter of Justin Archimède, who was elected Mayor of Morne-à-l'eau back in 1923. Guadeloupean lawyer, she was the first woman member of the bar of Guadeloupe in 1939.

She had an active political career. in 1945, she is elected Departmental Councillor on the Social-Communist Proletarian group list before being elected deputy of Guadeloupe, as PCF (French Communist Party) group member from November 10, 1946 until 17 April 1951. She has been with Eugenie Eboué-Tell, one of the two first women deputy in Guadeloupe. In 1948, she became a member of the French Communist Party, which designated her as its representative in numerous conference throughout the world.

In 1952, she returned to the bar in Guadeloupe, then is elected in 1953 as Deputy of Basse-Terre Mayor, Elie Chauferain, whilst continuing her activity as a lawyer, until she replaced him in 1956.

Feminist activist, she created in Guadeloupe a federation of the Union of the French Women: UFF ("Union des Femmes Françaises") (close to the PCF) to support her effort to obtain the enforcement of social security and retirement right for women in Guadeloupe. She contributed actively to the transformation of the UFF federation into the Union of Guadeloupean Women ("Union des Femmes Guadeloupéennes" in French)

In August 1969 she met Angela Davis, after arriving in Basse-Terre from Cuba by boat Davis and her friends have been arrested by French customs officers and had their passport confiscated. This encounter is related in Angela Davis' autobiography.

Tributes 
The Gerty Archimède museum (French: Musée Gerty Archimède) is settled in one of the house formerly inhabited by the guadeloupean personality since 1984; located 27 Maurice Marie street in Basse-Terre, it has the Maisons des Illustres certification since 2012.

A bronze statue has been inaugurated in her memory on 13 December 2002 on the maritime boulevard of Basse-Terre.

The Gerty Archimède street (rue Gerty Archimède) in the Paris 12th Arrondissement has been named after her in 2006, following a request from Parisians communist elected representatives.

In 2006, her nephew Alain Foix, wrote a play "Pas de prison pour le vent" (=No prison for wind in English) inspired by her encounter with Angela Davis in Guadeloupe.

On 27 January 2007, Ségolène Royal paid tribute to her during her election campaign.

On 14 January 2011, during the inauguration of a new amphitheater at the UAG in the city of Saint-Claude, the jury reveals the results after a referendum announcing Gerty Archimède will be the Caribbean personality the building will be named after.

See also 
 First women lawyers around the world

References

External links 
1st page on the French National Assembly website
2nd page on the French National Assembly website

1909 births
1980 deaths
People from Morne-à-l'Eau
Guadeloupean politicians
Guadeloupean women in politics
French Communist Party politicians
Deputies of the 1st National Assembly of the French Fourth Republic
French socialist feminists